(also known as Count Dracula) is a 1992 Japan-exclusive text adventure video game released for the NEC PC-9801, Sharp X68000 and FM Towns.

See also
Dracula in popular culture
List of Japanese erotic video games

External links
Dracula Hakushaku at fandc.co.jp
Dracula Hakushaku complete overview at Giant Bomb
Dracula Hakushaku at MobyGames
Dracula Hakushaku at NEC PC-9801 Data Base
Dracula Hakushaku (Sharp X68000) at GameFAQs

1992 video games
1990s horror video games
Adventure games
Eroge
Erotic video games
1990s interactive fiction
Japan-exclusive video games
FM Towns games
NEC PC-9801 games
X68000 games
Video games based on Dracula
Video games developed in Japan
Video games set in castles